Dale Husemöller (also spelled Husemoller) is an American mathematician specializing in algebraic topology and homological algebra who is known for his books on fibre bundles, elliptic curves, and, in collaboration with John Milnor, symmetric bilinear forms.

Life and career 

Husemöller was born in 1933 in Austin, Minnesota, USA. He earned his BA in mathematics at the University of Minnesota (December 1952). He began his graduate career there as a physicist, transferring to Harvard University in 1953. There, he switched from physics to the PhD program in mathematics.

He completed his Ph.D. at Harvard University in 1959. His doctoral supervisor was Lars Ahlfors.  His dissertation topic was Mappings, Automorphisms and Coverings of Riemann Surfaces.

After the PhD, he served on the faculty of the University of Rochester (1958-59) and the  Pennsylvania State University (1959 to 1961). There his interests shifted to topology. He spent most of his career at Haverford College from 1961 until his retirement in 1996. He is currently Professor Emeritus at Haverford. 

During Husemöller's career, he spent several sabbatical years as a visiting scholar at the Institut des Hautes Études Scientifiques (IHES) and at the University of Bonn. After retirement, he was visiting lecturer at both of these places as well as at the Universities of Munich, Heidelberg, and Münster, the Tata Institute in Bombay, the Institute of Physics and Mathematics in Tehran, and the Max Planck Institute for Mathematics in Bonn. He was a regular attendee at the Arbeitstagungen in Bonn. 

Professor Husemöller's five children Carl, Anna, Erich, Kurt, and Greta grew up on Haverford College Campus, and spent sabbatical years and subsequent summers with him at the Résidence de l'Ormaille at the IHES in France, and for another year at the Ernst-Moritz-Arndt Gymnasium in Bonn while he was at the University there. All five received their BAs at Haverford. Professor Husemöller has 10 grandchildren, Colette, Adrian, Ingrid, Paloma, Atena, Alexey, Annika, Jacob, Rose, and Mbali. He currently lives in western Massachusetts.

Bibliography 

His books and some of his papers include:

 Husemöller, Dale (1962). "Ramified Coverings of Riemann Surfaces," Duke Mathematical Journal, volume 29, pp. 167–79.
  2nd Edition (Springer Verlag), 1975; 3rd Edition (Springer Verlag), 1993. Russian Edition Rassloenye Prostranstva (Moscow: Izd. Mir) 1970.
 Husemöller, Dale with John Milnor (1974). Symmetric Bilinear Forms (Springer) Russian Edition Simmetricheskie bilineĭnye formy (Moscow: Navka), 1986.
 Husemöller, Dale with J.C. Moore and James Stasheff (1974). "Differential Homological Algebra and Homogeneous Spaces," in Journal of Pure and Applied Algebra, vol 5, pp. 115-85.
 Husemöller, Dale with Enrico Bombieri (1975). "Classification and Embeddings of Surfaces," in Proceedings of Symposia in Pure Mathematics, vol 29, pp. 320-420.
  2nd Edition (Springer) 2004.
 Husemöller, Dale with Pierre Deligne (1987). "Survey of Drinfel'd Modules," Current Trends in Arithmetic Algebraic Geometry, Contemporary Mathematics, vol. 67, ed. Ken Ribett, pp. 25-92. 
 
 Husemöller, Dale (2008). Basic Bundle Theory and K-Cohomology Invariants. Lecture Notes in Physics 726 (Springer).

References

External links
 

1933 births
Living people
20th-century American mathematicians
Harvard University alumni
Haverford College faculty
Topologists
People from Austin, Minnesota
Mathematicians from Minnesota
University of Minnesota College of Liberal Arts alumni
Pennsylvania State University faculty